Rohit Rajendra Pawar is a member of Maharashtra Legislative Assembly from the Karjat-Jamkhed constituency in Maharashtra, India. He belongs to the politically influential Pawar family

Early life and family 
Rohit Pawar was born to Rajendra Pawar and Sunanda Pawar in Baramati, Maharashtra on 29 September 1985.
He is the grandson of Appasaheb Pawar and also the grandnephew of prominent Indian political leader and former union agriculture minister of India- Sharad Pawar. He completed his schooling from Vidya Prathisthan, Baramati. He graduated in "Bachelor of Management" studies from University of Mumbai in the year 2007. Rohit Pawar is married to Kunti Pawar (née Magar).The couple has two children.

Business career
He is the CEO of Baramati Agro Ltd. He served as the President of the Indian Sugar Mills Association (ISMA) from September 2018 to 2019.

Political career 
Pawar contested and won the Zilla Parishad elections from Shirsuphal - Gunawadi constituency in Baramati taluka, Pune in 2017.
During the 2019 Indian General Elections, he campaigned for the Nationalist Congress Party.

In October 2019 he was elected to Maharashtra Vidhan Sabha from the Karjat-Jamkhed constituency with 135824 votes. He is from the forth generation of the Pawar family to hold public office.

Maharashtra Cricket Association  
Pawar was elected unopposed as the president of the Maharashtra Cricket Association (MCA).

See also
 Sharad Pawar
 Supriya Sule
 Ajit Pawar
 Sunanda Pawar

References

External links
 

Living people
People from Baramati
1985 births
Nationalist Congress Party politicians from Maharashtra
Maharashtra politicians
Marathi people